Saussurea alpina is a species of flowering plant belonging to the family Asteraceae.

Its native range is Europe to Siberia and China.

References

alpina